Gongshan Derung and Nu Autonomous County (Lisu: ꓗꓳꓹ-ꓢ ꓔꓴꓽ-ꓡꓳꓽ ꓫꓵꓽ ꓠꓳꓸ ꓫꓵꓽ ꓚꓲꓸ ꓛꓬꓽ ꓗꓪꓼ ꓫꓵꓽ ꓫꓯꓹ; Derung: Koksang, the name has nothing to do with the Derung language for Gaoligong Mountains) is an autonomous county located in Nujiang Lisu Autonomous Prefecture, in the northwest of Yunnan province, China. The county government is stationed in Cikai Town (Derung: Svkeun)

The Nu people in Gongshan (Vnung'long) belongs to the Anu branch (Vnung) and use the Anu language (Nujiang dialect of the Derung language).

Etymology 
The county is named after the Gaoligong Mountains, which run through the county. The country is known historically as Chamutong or Tramutang.

Administrative divisions
The county is divided into two towns and three townships.

History 
The People's Liberation Army took the county on August 25, 1949, and a provisional government was set up on March 11, 1950. On April 8, the Gongshan County People's Government was established. In October 1956, Gongshan County was changed to Gongshan Derung and Nu Autonomous County.

Geography

The county's boundary with Burma is 172.008 kilometers in length, and the county's boundary with Tibet is 135 kilometers.

It is located in the Hengduan Mountains, and with the Salween and N'Mai rivers running through the county. The N'Mai River is known for its green appearance.

Climate

Demographics 
The county's population as of the 2010 Chinese Census was 37,894, up from the 34,746 recorded in the 2000 Chinese Census, and the 33,000 people estimated to be living in the county as of 1996.

As of 2003, 34,622 people were living in the county, of which, 83.8% lived in rural areas. The ethnic composition of the county in 2003 was 51.7% Lisu, 18.2% Nu, 14.7% Derung, 4.6% Tibetan, 6.3% other officially recognized ethnic groups, and the remaining 4.5% belonging to unrecognized ethnic groups.

Economy 
Mineral deposits in the county include lead, tin, zinc, white marble, and mutton fat jade.

Culture
Gongshan is a notoriously remote place, isolated by its mountains and gorges. National Geographic author Joseph F. Rock came to the area during the 1920s and early 1930s, and wrote about the area in several articles for National Geographic Magazine. He described Gongshan as a virgin land where no white man had ever came before, and as a paradise for explorers, photographers and botanists.

The county's Derung and Nu people host numerous ethnic festivals.

Piao Niu Wu 

Piao Niu Wu (literally "slaughter cattle dance") is a traditional ceremony of the Derung People unique to Gongshan County. Traditionally performed during Derung New Year, the ceremony is prepared by tying a cattle to a sacrificial pole with traditional Derung rope, placing bead ornaments on the cattle, and placing other material sacrifices in front of it. The host of the ceremony then leads a prayer, and another man pierces the cattle's heart with a bamboo spear once the prayer is finished. Before preparing the dead cattle for further use, the ceremony host performs a ritual fortune-telling. This follows with traditional song and dance. In modern times, the festival has become less common, and is typically for entertainment purposes, rather than spiritual ones.

See also
Three Parallel Rivers of Yunnan Protected Areas – UNESCO World Heritage Site
Dimaluo – village in Pengdang Township

References

External links

Gongshan County

County-level divisions of Nujiang Prefecture
Autonomous counties of the People's Republic of China